Anna Katarzyna Magdalena Żeńca (born Anna Świątczak 30 March 1977) also known as Aniqa, is a pop singer and ex wife of Michał Wiśniewski, the leader singer of Ich Troje band, in which she sang between 2003 and 2009. In July 2010 it was officially announced that she was leaving the band to pursue her solo career.

Their first child, Etiennette Anna, was born before they married, on 17 September 2006. Anna miscarried their second child Falco Christian on 15 May 2007. Their third child Vivienne Vienna was born on 2 February 2008.

1992-2003: Beginnings

She made her debut in 1992 in Zielona Góra, on the continuation of the Soviet Song Festival - "Slavic Bazaar", where she sang with the band Wiolinki, and a year later, together with her friends, founded a punk rock band Kurki Z Jednej Dziórka. In 1995, she took part in the program Szansa for success with the song "Pamiętasz było jesień" by Sława Przybylska. Świątczak won the episode as well as the entire edition of the program at the final concert in the Sala Kongresowa in Warsaw. She also won the audience award in the Debuts competition at the Polish National Song Festival in Opole. She sang in backing vocals in the program Jaka to melodia ?. In the meantime, she recorded backing vocals to pieces released on the albums of Andrzej Piaseczny, Natalia Kukulska, Kai Paschalska and Sylwia Wiśniewska.

2003-2010: Ich Troje and a solo album

In 2003, she became the vocalist of the band Ich Troje, replacing Justyna Majkowska. On June 21, 2004, the band's sixth album was released (the first recorded with Anna Świątczak), titled the 6th last stop, which gained the status of a gold record, selling in a circulation of about 35,000. copies. At the end of January 2006, the group took part in Polish eliminations to the 51st Eurovision Song Contest, during which they took the first place with the song "Follow My Heart". In May, the band performed during the concert of the semi-final spectacle and took 11th place in it, not qualifying for the final. On December 18 of the same year, they released their seventh record, entitled deadly sins, the album promoted singles God is Love (2006) and Perfect Love (2007). On December 13, 2008, they released their eighth record entitled The Eighth Foreign Passenger, which was promoted by one single Play In Team (2008).

From 2016: Mińska LIFE and Punkt zwrotny #Pierwszy

On June 24, 2016, she took part in a concert held in Katowice on the occasion of the twentieth anniversary of Ich Troje. In the same year, she released a studio album entitled Minska LIFE, which she recorded along with the Christian Southern Community.

From June 1, 2017, he conducts a religious talk show. Turning point in the Christian television of TBN Polska. In the same year, she announced the release of a studio album, entitled #Pierwszy. The material for the record was recorded in GarażStudio in Sulejówek, the producer of the publishing house will be Andrzej Żarnecki.

Discography

Albums

References

1977 births
People from Lubliniec
Living people
Eurovision Song Contest entrants of 2006
Musicians from Katowice
Eurovision Song Contest entrants for Poland
21st-century Polish singers

vi:Ania Wiśniewska